Ethmia burnsella is a moth in the family Depressariidae. It is found in the United States in northern Texas.

The ground color of the forewings is pale ocherous, although the costal area is pale gray-brown and distinctly paler than the brownish black spots of the dorsal half. The ground color of the hindwings is white basally, becoming pale ocherous distally and along the anal margin.

References

Moths described in 1973
burnsella